Igor Douven a philosopher, cognitive psychologist and formal epistemologist, known for coordinating the research group Formal Epistemology: Foundations and Applications at the KU Leuven.

In 2010 he became Endowed Chair in philosophy at the University of Groningen.  In 2013, he joined the "Probability, Assessment, Reasoning and Inferences Studies" research group at Paris 8 University.

Selected publications 
 "Wouldn't It Be Lovely: Explanation and Scientific Realism", Metascience 14, 3 (2006) 331-361. (Review Symposium on the second edition of Inference to the Best Explanation, with James Ladyman, Igor Douven and Bas van Fraassen.)

References

External links 
 ResearchGate profile

Academic staff of the University of Groningen
Epistemologists
Year of birth missing (living people)
Living people
Academic staff of KU Leuven